Laurence J. Day (October 18, 1913 – June 26, 1983) was an American farmer, electrical contractor, and politician.

Born in the town of Elderon, Wisconsin, Day went to refrigeration and electrical vocational schools. He was also involved with conservation and agriculture. Day served as clerk for the town of Elderon. He served in the Wisconsin State Assembly 1969–1977, as a Democrat. He died in Marshfield, Wisconsin.

Notes

1913 births
1983 deaths
People from Wood County, Wisconsin
20th-century American politicians
People from Marshfield, Wisconsin
Democratic Party members of the Wisconsin State Assembly